Krishna Chandra Dey (24 August 1893 – 28 November 1962), better known as K.C. Dey, was an Indian music director, music composer, musician, singer, actor, and music teacher born in Calcutta (now Kolkata). He was S.D. Burman's first musical teacher and mentor. His father's name was Shibchandra Dey. In 1906, at the age of fourteen, he lost his eyesight and became completely blind. He worked for various theatre groups and finally went on to work for New Theatres in Kolkata until 1940. He is best remembered for his Kirtan songs. He was patronized by many elite families of Calcutta at that time. He often sang in jalsa of Rajbari of Sovabazar, Mitra House of Beadon Street and many others. K.C. Dey recorded around 600 songs, mostly in Bengali, Hindi, Urdu, Gujarati and 8 Naats (Muslim religious songs).

Dey sang and composed music for movies from 1932 until 1946. He also acted in movies in the same period. Dey used to travel from Calcutta to Bombay (Mumbai) to take part in movies. In 1942 he moved to Bombay. Dey quit movies in 1946 after the quality of both his music and singing started going down. The blind singer died in Kolkata on 28 November 1962. Playback singer Manna Dey was his nephew.

Filmography

Actor 

 Bhagaban Shrikrishna Chaitanya (1954)
 Prahlad (1952)
 Anirban (1948)
 Drishtidan (1948)
 Purabi (1948)
 Insaan (1944)... Blind singer
 Tamanna (1942)
 Chanakya (1939)... Beggar
 Sapera (1939)
 Sapurey (1939)... Ghantaburo ... a.k.a. The Snake-Charmer (India: English title)
 Desher Mati (1938)... Kunja... a.k.a. Mother Earth.. a.k.a. Motherland ... a.k.a. Soil of the Motherland
 Dharti Mata (1938)... Kunja
 Bidyapati (1937)... Madhusudan
 Vidyapati (1937)... Madhusudan
 Devdas (1936)
 Grihadaha (1936)
 Manzil (1936)
 Maya (1936/I)
 Maya (1936/II)
 Pujarin (1936)... Blind Beggar
 Bhagya Chakra (1935)... Surdas
 Devdas (1935)
 Dhoop Chhaon (1935)... Surdas
 Inquilab (1935)... Musafir
 Shaher Ka Jadoo (1934)... Baldev
 Nala Damayanti (1933)
 Puran Bhagat (1933)
 Sabitri (1933)... Dyumatsen
 Meera (1933)
 Chandidas (1932)... Sridam

Music department 

 Bhagaban Shrikrishna Chaitanya (1954) (playback singer)
 Tamanna (1942)
 Sapurey (1939)
 Dharti Mata (1938)
 Vidyapati (1937)
 Bhagya Chakra (1935)
 Devdas (1935)
 Chandidas (1932)

Composer 

 Purabi (1948)
 Shakuntala (1941)
 Milap (1937)
 Ambikapathy (1937) (Background music)
 Baghi Sipahi (1936)
 Sonar Sansar (1936)
 Sunehra Sansar (1936)
 Chandragupta (1934)
 Shaher Ka Jadoo (1934)

References

External links 
www.krishnachandradey.com - Comprehensive Resource Website, offering preview of his songs
Manna Dey page from Calcuttaweb
S.D. Burman's life from sdburman.net
The Hindu Business Line article
Krishna Chandra Dey page from abasar.net

1893 births
1962 deaths
Male actors from Kolkata
Bengali male actors
Male actors in Bengali cinema
Indian male playback singers
Blind musicians
20th-century Indian singers
20th-century Indian male actors
Singers from Kolkata
20th-century Indian male singers